Rome, also called Rome Station after its sole business, is an unincorporated community in Malheur County, Oregon, United States. It is part of the Ontario, OR–ID Micropolitan Statistical Area. Jordan Creek enters the river slightly downstream of Rome.

Name
According to Oregon Geographic Names, Rome was named by William F. Stine for the nearby geologic formations that suggested the ruined temples of Rome, Italy.

Post offices
Rome's former post office was established in 1909. Leonard R. Duncan was the first postmaster.  Postal service is now out of Jordan Valley.

In the mid-19th century, there was another Oregon community named Rome. It was in Marion County, near Woodburn, and had a post office in 1851–52.

Transportation
Rome State Airport is near Rome. In addition to U.S. Route 95, several high-desert roads converge at or near Rome. These include the Old Idaho–Oregon–Nevada Highway, Rome Road, Skull Creek Road, and Indian Fort Creek Road.

Climate
Rome has a cold desert climate (BWk) according to the Köppen climate classification system.

References

External links
Historic photo of Rome from the Salem Public Library

Ontario, Oregon micropolitan area
Unincorporated communities in Malheur County, Oregon
1909 establishments in Oregon
Populated places established in 1909
Unincorporated communities in Oregon